Ralph Trenewith (died 1393), of Trenowth in St. Probus, Cornwall, was an English Member of Parliament for Truro 1377 and 1393.

References

14th-century births
1393 deaths
People from Cornwall
14th-century English people
English MPs January 1377
English MPs 1393
English MPs October 1377